Cunampaia is a dubious genus of extinct mesoeucrocodylian. Fossils have been found from the Divisadero Largo Formation of Mendoza Province, Argentina, and date back to the Divisaderan to Tinguirirican regional South American Land Mammal Age of the Late Eocene epoch.

Description 
Originally it was regarded as a gruiform bird, being only recently reassigned as a crocodylomorph. In 1968 it was placed in its own family, Cunampaiidae, which falls within the suborder Cariamae. Despite this classification, it has frequently been referred to as a phorusrhacid.

Due to the lack of autapomorphies associated with the genus, Cunampaia is now considered to be a nomen dubium. As a result of this, its position is indeterminate within Mesoeucrocodylia.

References 

Eocene crocodylomorphs
Eocene reptiles of South America
Tinguirirican
Divisaderan
Paleogene Argentina
Fossils of Argentina
Fossil taxa described in 1946
Nomina dubia

nl:Niet meer geaccepteerde schrikvogelnamen#Cunampaia